Rob de Wit (born 8 September 1963) is a Dutch former football player.

Career 

De Wit made his debut for FC Utrecht in the 1982–83 season. He was a member of the Dutch squad at the 1983 FIFA World Youth Championship. He was transferred to Ajax Amsterdam two seasons later, July 1984, as successor of left wing attacker Jesper Olsen, who left to Manchester United. At Ajax, he quickly became a crowd favourite, and played nearly all of the matches, the 1984–1985 and 1985–1986 seasons. On 1985-05-01, still in his first season at Ajax, De Wit made his debut for the Dutch national team in a World Cup qualifier against Austria. Nearly two weeks later, De Wit scored the winning goal against Hungary (0–1 away win), which won the Netherlands a play-off match against Belgium for the 1986 FIFA World Cup.

De Wit's career came to an abrupt end in 1986, due to a cerebral hemorrhage while on holiday in Spain. At first, the consequences didn't seem to be serious. After an unsuccessful treatment in Sweden, it became clear that Rob de Wit would never play professional football again. He sustained two more cerebral hemorrhages later in life: one in 1993 and one in January 2005.

De Wit played 103 league matches in four seasons, scoring 23 goals.

References

External links
Statistics of Rob de Wit for the Netherlands national football team

1963 births
Living people
Dutch footballers
FC Utrecht players
AFC Ajax players
Eredivisie players
Netherlands youth international footballers
Netherlands international footballers
Footballers from Utrecht (city)
Association football wingers